Robert Atha (born September 22, 1960, in Marietta, Ohio) is a former American football placekicker, punter and quarterback who played college football for the Ohio State Buckeyes and NFL football for the Miami Dolphins and the Arizona Cardinals.

From 1978 to 1980, Atha played for the Buckeyes as a backup to the quarterback Art Schlichter and the placekicker Vlade Janakievski. In 1981, Atha earned the starting position as placekicker. He continued as a backup quarterback behind Mike Tomczak. Atha led the team in scoring that year with 88 points: 13 field goals, 43 PATs and one touchdown. He earned the key of worthington for his achievements. After his years of Ohio football he got drafted
to the Miami Dolphins.

During an October 24, 1981, game in Ohio Stadium, Atha made five field goals to set an Ohio State school and stadium record. The record has not been surpassed but it has been tied by Mike Nugent (at North Carolina State on September 19, 2004) and Josh Huston (vs. 2005 Texas Longhorns football team on September 17, 2005, in Ohio Stadium). It was most recently tied on September 11, 2010, by Devin Barclay versus the University of Miami.

Atha is married to Carol Atha and has a daughter named Lauren Atha Skinner, and two sons Hunter and Tanner Atha. He is the owner of Houghton Investments, an oilfield production company in Ohio.

References

1960 births
Living people
Sportspeople from Marietta, Ohio
American football placekickers
Ohio State Buckeyes football players